Do-hyun, also spelled Do-hyeon, is a Korean masculine given name. Its meaning depends on the hanja used to write each syllable of the name. There are 44 hanja with the reading "do" and 35 hanja with the reading "hyun" on the South Korean government's list of hanja which may be registered for use in given names. Do-hyun was the ninth-most popular name for newborn boys in South Korea in 2008, fell out of the top ten in 2009, and returned to tenth place in 2011.

People with this name include:
Ahn Do-hyun (born 1961), South Korean poet, winner of the 1999 Sowol Poetry Prize
Yoon Do-hyun (born 1972), South Korean rock singer, lead vocalist of YB
Kim Do-hyun (born 1994), South Korean footballer
Oh Do-hyun (born 1994), South Korean football defender
Lee Do-hyun (born 1995), South Korean actor
Pine (gamer) (born Kim Do-hyeon, 1997), South Korean professional Overwatch player
Kim Do-hyeon, South Korean dancer, silver medalist in dancesport at the 2010 Asian Games
Im Do-hyun, South Korean judo practitioner, represented South Korea at the 2010 Asian Games

See also
List of Korean given names

References

Korean masculine given names